Si yo fuera rico is a Chilean telenovela written by Rodrigo Cuevas, that premiered on Mega on January 8, 2018 and ended on October 2, 2018. It stars Jorge Zabaleta, Mariana Loyola, Gonzalo Valenzuela, María Gracia Omegna, Daniel Muñoz and Simón Pesutic.

Plot 
The life of three Chileans will change after winning a coveted game of chance: Miguel, a lonely thief who will keep the winning lottery ticket he found in Pascuala's car, who never knew that the ticket had the winning numbers and, as her discreet benefactor, will make love flourish between them. Nelson, who lives in a small place and is immature and emotional, has been dreaming of winning a grand prize and quickly decides to buy the football team he has supported since he was a child, "Renca Juniors", to turn them into the Real Madrid of South America. Matilde and Tomás Varela are orphans who have lived a life marked by tragedy. Matilde buys a lucky ticket, but discovers that she cannot claim it because she is a minor. When Dante, a charming prince who has come to save her, appears, she does not imagine that he is actually the nephew of a scammer who organized the meeting.

Cast 
 Jorge Zabaleta as Nelson Peña
 Mariana Loyola as Julia Molina
 Gonzalo Valenzuela as Miguel "Micky" Zunino
 María Gracia Omegna as Pascuala Domínguez
 Daniel Muñoz como Erick Ferrada / Erick Zapata.
 Simón Pesutic as Dante Galaz
 Solange Lackington as Mónica Salas
 María Fernanda Martínez as Matilde Varela
 Coca Guazzini as Yolanda "Yoli" Santander
 Claudio Arredondo as "El Compadre" Inostroza
 Fernando Larraín as Rubén de la Maza
 Katyna Huberman as Antonia Miller
 Álvaro Gómez as Facundo Grandinetti
 Carolina Arredondo as Tamara Martínez
 Manuela Opazo as Begoña Cuadra
 Oliver Börner as Ronaldo "Rony" Peña
 Diego Guerrero as Felipe "Pipe" Ríos
 Magdalena Urra as Lucía "Lucy" Brito
 Catalina Benítez as Camila Peña
 Andrés Commentz as Tomás "Tomy" Varela / Tomás Salas
 Matilde Campero as Constanza "Cuky" Palma
 Sergio Hernández as Aquiles Zapata
 Pablo Cerda as Nicolás Ríos
 Teresita Commentz as Marisela Ibáñez
 Nahuel Cantillano as Santiago Palma
 Antonia Bosman as Alejandra Cienfuegos
 Patricio Andrade as Ricardo Galaz
 Carlos Martínez as González
 Rodrigo Walker as Pedro Martínez
 María Zamarbide as Lola Luján
 Gastón Pauls as Leonel
 Daniela Domínguez as Patricia "Paty" Escobar
 Francisco González as Demetrio Ortiz
 Pelusa Troncoso as Irma Sanhueza
 Seide Tosta as Laura
 Pablo Green as Marcos Aguilera
 Renato Illanes as Edo Rojas
 Sebastián Altamirano as Reinaldo Peña
 Julio César Serrano as Rucio
 Patricio Jara as Garzón
 Dylan González as Soto
 Hugo Vásquez as Fernando

Ratings

References

External links 
 

2018 Chilean television series debuts
2018 Chilean television series endings
2018 telenovelas
Chilean telenovelas
Mega (Chilean TV channel) telenovelas
Spanish-language telenovelas